A Thief in the Night may refer to:

Print works
 A Thief in the Night (short story collection), a 1905 collection of short stories by Ernest William Hornung, featuring his popular character A. J. Raffles
 Thief in the Night, a 1961 book by Bahá'í author William Sears
 A Thief in the Night (Cornwell book), a 1989 book by John Cornwell investigating the death of Pope John Paul I and its conspiracy theories

Moving-image works
 A Thief in the Night, 1913 short film by directed by George Terwilliger
 A Thief in the Night (film series), the Christian end times film series
 A Thief in the Night (film), the 1972 first installment of the film series
 "A Thief in the Night", episode of The Transformers cartoon TV series

Musical works
 Recorded performances of "Thief in the Night", song originally recorded by Nutshell:
 by Nutshell on 1979 album Believe It or Not
 by Cliff Richard on  1982 album Now You See Me, Now You Don't,
 "Thief in the Night", song by the Rolling Stones on their 1997 album Bridges to Babylon
 "Thief in the Night", song by Craig David on his 2005 album The Story Goes...
 "Thief in the Night", song by Rod Wave on his 2020 album Pray 4 Love
 Thief in the Night (album), 1985 album by George Duke